General elections were held in Montserrat on 11 September 2014. The result was a victory for the newly established People's Democratic Movement, which won seven of the nine elected seats in the Legislative Assembly.

Electoral system
At the time of the election, the Legislative Assembly had eleven members, of which nine were elected. The other two seats were taken by the Attorney General and the Financial Secretary. The territory was a single nine-member constituency, with voters able to vote for nine candidates on their ballot paper.

Campaign
A new party, the People's Democratic Movement (PDM), was established by leader of the opposition Donaldson Romeo on 30 April 2014, in order to contest the elections. A total 31 candidates contested the elections; the ruling Movement for Change and Prosperity and the PDM both put forward a full slate of nine candidates, the Alliance of Independent Candidates had three independent candidates, with ten other independents also running.

Results

References

Montserrat
Montserrat
Elections in Montserrat
2014 in Montserrat
Election and referendum articles with incomplete results
September 2014 events in North America